Mykhailo "Misha" Petrovych Mudryk (born 5 January 2001) is a Ukrainian professional footballer who plays as a left winger for  club Chelsea and the Ukraine national team. 

Mudryk began his career in the academies of Metalist Kharkiv and Dnipro, before moving to Shakhtar Donetsk in 2016. He made his professional debut two years later, followed by loans to Arsenal Kyiv and Desna Chernihiv. In 2023, he moved to English side Chelsea in a transfer worth an initial €70 million (£62 million), making him the most expensive Ukrainian footballer of all time and the most expensive player ever signed from the Ukrainian Premier League.

Mudryk has been a Ukrainian senior international since 2022, having previously been capped at several youth levels.

Club career

Shakhtar Donetsk

Early career
Mudryk started playing football at Metalist Kharkiv in 2010, before moving to Dnipro's academy in 2014. After quickly rising through the age groups, Mudryk attracted the interest of Shakhtar Donetsk, who signed him for their academy in 2016.

2018–2021: Senior debut and loans
In the 2018–19 season, he played for Shakhtar in the U21 category. Later that year, Mudryk was promoted to the first team, and was given his senior debut (aged 17) by manager Paulo Fonseca on 31 October 2018 in a Ukrainian Cup match against Olimpik Donetsk, which Shakhtar won 1–0.

After finding limited first-team minutes, in order to continue his development, in February 2019, he was loaned to Ukrainian Premier League side Arsenal Kyiv for the remainder of the 2018–19 season, playing 10 matches without scoring any goals. He played in the Ukrainian Premier League against Desna Chernihiv, Kolos Kovalivka, and Oleksandriya giving the contribution to win the title in the 2019–20 season. In the summer of 2020, League of Ireland Premier Division side Dundalk approached Shakhtar about a loan move, however the Ukrainian club preferred that he remain in his homeland, and instead he signed a loan agreement with the Ukrainian Premier League club Desna Chernihiv and qualified for the UEFA Europa League third qualifying round. He stayed 4 months in Chernihiv and played 10 matches in the Ukrainian Premier League and once in the Ukrainian Cup.

2021–2023: Breakthrough and development
On 8 January 2021, Mudryk returned to Shakhtar, playing 3 matches in the Ukrainian Premier League and joining Shakhtar's reserve, featuring sporadically for manager Luís Castro.
In the 2021–22 season, Mudryk found more and more space as a starter, especially with the arrival of Roberto De Zerbi at the helm of Shakhtar, who had the reputation of trusting in young players. With his previous managers, failing to bring the best out of Mudryk, De Zerbi decided to recall him from his loan spell and requested a meeting with him. After the meeting, Mudryk developed a new mentality and his manager considered him one of the best young players, adding that "if I don't bring him to a high level, I will consider it a personal defeat". 

On 25 August, Mudryk made his UEFA Champions League debut against AS Monaco, replacing Manor Solomon in the 82nd minute in the play-off round of the tournament. His cross in the 114th minute, ricochet off Ruben Aguilar on the Monegasque net, as Shakhtar qualified to the tournament 3–2 on aggregate. On 18 September, he scored his first goal for the club in a 5–0 win against Mariupol at the Volodymyr Boyko Stadium. On 3 December, Mudryk provided four assists in a 6–1 win against Lviv. On 31 December, he agreed to a contract extension to 2026. He was named the club's Player of the Month for the months of November and December.

On 24 February, the Ukrainian Premier League was suspended due to the imposition of martial law in Ukraine due to the prelude to the 2022 Russian invasion of Ukraine and subsequent invasion by Russia. Mudryk finished the season with 2 goals and 9 assists, being named the club's Player of the Year, attracting the attention of a number of European clubs including Sevilla and Arsenal.

With football resuming in Ukraine, Mudryk started the 2022–23 season, by scored his first Champions League goal and providing two assists in a 4–1 away win over RB Leipzig. This was followed by another goal in a 1–1 Champions League draw to Celtic. On 19 October, he scored a brace in a 3–0 over Kolos Kovalivka. His prolific form saw him score seven goals and provide six assists in 12 matches, being named the Ukrainian Footballer of the Year and Shakhtar's Player of the Year.

Chelsea
Despite being linked to a transfer for Premier League club Arsenal in the winter transfer window, on 15 January 2023, Mudryk was signed by Chelsea on a permanent deal, penning a eight-and-a-half year for an initial fee of fee of €70 million (£62 million), rising to €100 million (£89 million) in add-ons. This was Shakhtar and the Ukrainian Premier League's biggest transfer ever, making him the most expensive Ukrainian footballer of all time, topping the previous record held by Fred, who moved to Manchester United for £52 million (€53 million), rising to £61.2 million in bonuses, in 2018. Upon his arrival to the club he was handed the number 15 shirt. Mudryk's debut came on 21 January, as Chelsea drew Liverpool 0–0 in a league game at the Anfield. His first start came against Fulham in a 0–0 draw on 4th February. He was substituted at half-time by debutant Noni Madueke due to fatigue caused by a cold. Mykhailo would go on to earn his first Premier League assist in a 3-1 away victory against Leicester City on March 11.

International career

Youth
From 2017 to 2018, he played for the Ukraine national under-17 football team. From 2018 to 2019, he played for the Ukraine national under-19 football team, appearing in 12 matches and scoring 5 goals. In 2019, he was included in the Ukraine national under-21 football team, playing 16 matches and scoring 3 goals. On 7 September 2021, he scored the winning goal from free-kick against Armenia.

Senior
In April 2022, he has been called in Ukraine national football team in the training camp in April-May 2022 in Slovenia for the first time. On 11 May 2022, he made his debut in the friendly game against Borussia Mönchengladbach scoring his first goal at the Borussia-Park in Mönchengladbach, during the Global Tour for Peace. His official debut took place on 1 June, in the 2022 FIFA World Cup qualifying playoff semi-finals, which Ukraine won 3–1 against Scotland.

Style of play 
Mudryk is a right-footed winger who is most comfortable cutting in from the left onto his stronger foot. His acceleration is a particular strength, as he is able to reach his top speed extremely quickly from a standing start. This allows him to stand his opponent up before knocking the ball either way and darting away from them. He often does this down the touchline and onto his weaker foot – the direction in which his opponent won’t expect him to go – before putting a cross into the box. His acceleration allows him to draw fouls from opponents who can’t get goal side of him or gets away from them and into space. This tactic helps Mudryk move inside wide from the left, before combining with teammates in the centre of the pitch or working a shooting opportunity for himself, especially on the counter as he provides the perfect profile to successfully turn defense into attack. 

His dribbling is also strong part of his game. The way he centres himself over the ball – using little outside-of-the-boot touches – keeps defenders retreating at a pace that he can dictate. He has the intelligence to drive in a direction that pins space for himself or team-mates, has the willingness to go inside or outside, and has more than enough pace to confidently drive through gaps. Mudryk often hugs the touchline and looks to drive at the opposition before cutting in or finding a midfielder or overlapping the fullback to release the ball. Mudryk usually keeps his distance from the fullback, meaning he can use his pace instead of strength to get past him and it works effectively and he often zooms away, leading an attack.

Personal life
Known as "Misha" to his friends and coaches, he was born and raised in Krasnohrad, Kharkiv Oblast. An Orthodox Christian, he frequently carries religious icons to matches and has spoken openly about the importance faith has to him, which was shown by his grandmother. Mudryk has several tattoos, but considers the one which reads "Only Jesus" as his most important.

Career statistics

Club

International

Honours
Shakhtar Donetsk
 Ukrainian Premier League: 2019–20
 Ukrainian Cup: 2018–19
 Ukrainian Super Cup: 2021

Individual
 Ukrainian Footballer of the Year: 2022
 Golden talent of Ukraine: 2021, 2022
 Shakhtar Donetsk Player of the Year: 2021, 2022

References

External links

Profile at the Chelsea F.C. website

2001 births
Living people
People from Krasnohrad
Sportspeople from Kharkiv Oblast
Ukrainian footballers
Association football wingers
FC Shakhtar Donetsk players
FC Arsenal Kyiv players
FC Desna Chernihiv players
Chelsea F.C. players
Ukrainian Premier League players

Ukraine youth international footballers
Ukraine under-21 international footballers
Ukraine international footballers
Ukrainian expatriate footballers
Expatriate footballers in England
Ukrainian expatriate sportspeople in England